Valsassina is a valley in the Alps of Lombardy, northern Italy, within the province of Lecco.

It is included between the Grigne range from West, and the Bergamo Prealps which, in a half-circle stretching from North to East, separate it from the valley of the area of Bergamo and the Valtellina. Valsassina also reaches the Lecco's branch of Lake Como at Lecco itself and Bellano.

The valley is run by the Pioverna stream, which flows from the Grigne to the Lake Como. It's peculiar because it flows South-to-North.

Morphology
Valsassina is enclosed between the group of Grigne, to the west, and the group of the Bergamo Alps, which, in a semi-circle from the east to the north, separate it from the valleys of Bergamo and Valtellina. It connects to the Lecco branch of Lake Como with two outlets, in Lecco and Bellano. There is a link road to the valleys of Bergamo: the provincial road 64 Prealpina Orobica that the municipality of Moggio rooms at St. Peter's climax and then descend in the Val Taleggio.
The valley is covered in all its length from Pioverna, which stems from the Grigna and flows north and flows into Lake Como at Bellano, municipality where the river forms a spectacular gorge called the Ravine of Bellano.

Cheese
The dairy production is the strength of the economy of Valsassina. The new cheese makers have not forgotten the ancient livestock raising rules which provide, among other things, the summer transfer of herds on the pastures at higher altitudes. The milk produced is processed to derive undoubted quality cheeses such as Taleggio: a cheese with a square shape, with a thin crust and the uniform and compact paste. Ideal alone accompanied with pears, or to flavor other dishes. There are numerous dairy farms that produce the Taleggio cheese with goat cheese, the Robiola to quartirolo over the ricotta.

References

 
Sassina
Sassina